Javier Wanga (born 17 August 1981) is a judoka who competes internationally for Aruba.

Career
Wanga competed at the 2000 Summer Olympics held in Sydney, Australia, he entered the 66 kg weight division, but lost in the first round to Australian Andrew Collett, so didn't advance any further.

References

1981 births
Living people
Aruban male judoka
Judoka at the 2000 Summer Olympics
Olympic judoka of Aruba